Morriss is an old Welsh surname. It derives from the Latin name Mauritius, which means dark. In Great Britain, Maurice was the learned form of the name Morriss. Notable people with the name include:

Frank Morriss (1927–2013), American film and television editor
Guy Morriss (1951–2022), American football player and coach
Jeremy Morriss, New Zealand Paralympic boccia player
Margaret Shove Morriss (1884–1975), American historian
Mark Morriss (born 1971), English singer-songwriter
Scott Morriss (born 1973), English bass player
Simon Morriss (born 1985), Australian baseball player

See also
Morris (surname)

References